Ulavapadu railway station (station code:UPD), is an Indian Railways station in Ulavapadu of Andhra Pradesh. It is situated on Vijayawada–Gudur section of Vijayawada railway division in South Coast Railway zone.

Classification 
In terms of earnings and outward passengers handled, Ulavapadu is categorized as a Non-Suburban Grade-6 (NSG-6) railway station. Based on the re–categorization of Indian Railway stations for the period of 2017–18 and 2022–23, an NSG–6 category station earns nearly  crore and handles close to  passengers.

References

External links 
 

Railway stations in Prakasam district
Railway stations in Vijayawada railway division
Transport in Prakasam district
Buildings and structures in Prakasam district